Oberottmarshausen is a municipality  in the district of Augsburg in Bavaria in Germany.

Transport
The municipality has a railway station, on the Bobingen–Landsberg am Lech line.

References

Augsburg (district)